The 1986–87 Northern Football League season was the 89th in the history of Northern Football League, a football competition in England.

Division One

Division One featured 18 clubs which competed in the division last season, along with two new clubs, promoted from Division Two:
 Blue Star, who also changed name to Newcastle Blue Star
 Easington Colliery

League table

Division Two

Division Two featured 17 clubs which competed in the division last season, along with two new clubs, relegated from Division One:
 Billingham Synthonia
 Billingham Town

League table

References

External links
 Northern Football League official site

Northern Football League seasons
1986–87 in English football leagues